The 2012–13 season was Airdrie United's first season back in the Scottish First Division. Airdrie also competed in the Challenge Cup, League Cup and the Scottish Cup. Airdrie were due to compete in their third consecutive season in the Scottish Second Division, having been relegated from the Scottish First Division at the end of the 2009–10 season. On 16 July 2012, it was confirmed that Airdrie would be promoted to the Scottish First Division to fill the vacancy left by Dundee's promotion to the Scottish Premier League. This was to fill the slot vacated by Rangers, who were voted into the Scottish Third Division following their liquidation.

Summary

Season
During season 2012–13 Airdrie United finished tenth in the Scottish First Division, and were relegated to the Scottish Second Division. They reached the second round of the Challenge Cup, the first round of the League Cup and the third round of the Scottish Cup.

League table

Results and fixtures

Pre season

Scottish First Division

Scottish Challenge Cup

Scottish League Cup

Scottish Cup

Player statistics

Squad 
Last updated 5 May 2013

|}

Disciplinary record
Includes all competitive matches.
Last updated 5 May 2013

Awards

Last updated 28 September 2012

Division summary

Transfers
Willie McLaren was initially released by the club but later re-signed.

Players in

Players out

References

Airdrie
Airdrieonians F.C. seasons